Vladimirs Mamonovs (born April 22, 1980 in Riga, Latvian SSR, Soviet Union) is a Latvian professional ice hockey player.  He plays Left Wing. He currently plays for Sary-Arka Karaganda of the Kazakhstani Championship.

Career statistics

Regular season and playoffs

LAT totals do not include numbers from the 2002–03, 2005–06, 2008–09 and 2010–11 seasons.

International

External links

1980 births
HK Liepājas Metalurgs players
HK Riga 2000 players
Ice hockey players at the 2006 Winter Olympics
Latvian ice hockey left wingers
Living people
Olympic ice hockey players of Latvia
Ice hockey people from Riga